Judy's Bounce is an album by American jazz saxophonist Jemeel Moondoc, which was recorded live in 1981 and released on the Italian Soul Note label. He leads a trio with bassist Fred Hopkins and drummer Ed Blackwell. The title track is dedicated to concert producer Judy Sneed.

Reception

The Penguin Guide to Jazz notes "His early group, Ensemble Muntu, was very much in the Taylor mould, but Moondoc remained open to other influences as well. 'One for Ornette' accounts for only the most obvious; his playing style sits somewhere between Ornette's country wail and Jimmy Lyons' street-corner preaching."

Track listing
All compositions by Jemeel Moondoc
"Judy's Bounce" - 8:43
"Echo in Blue" - 13:42
"One for Ornette" - 8:40
"Nimus" - 13:38

Personnel
Jemeel Moondoc - alto sax
Fred Hopkins - bass
Ed Blackwell - drums

References

1982 live albums
Jemeel Moondoc live albums
Black Saint/Soul Note live albums